Sleepwalkers is a 1978 Spanish film written and directed by Manuel Gutiérrez Aragón starring Ana Belén alongside Norman Briski, María Rosa Salgado, Lola Gaos and José Luis Gómez.

Plot 
The plot's historical backdrop is the Burgos trials. Ana, an activist involved  in the anti-Francoist struggle, has seemingly converted some of her life's worries into bodily symptoms, suffering from strange maladies.

Cast

Release 
The film screened at the 26th San Sebastián International Film Festival in September 1978. In 1979, a jury formed by the Madrid's , the Barcelona's  and other producers selected the film to be the Spanish submission to the 51st Academy Awards.

Accolades 

|-
| align = "center" | 1978 || 26th San Sebastián International Film Festival || Silver Shell for Best Director || Manuel Gutiérrez Aragón ||  || align =" center" | 
|}

See also 
 List of Spanish films of 1978
 List of submissions to the 51st Academy Awards for Best Foreign Language Film
 List of Spanish submissions for the Academy Award for Best Foreign Language Film

References

Bibliography 
 
 
 

Films set in Spain
1978 films
Films set in 1970
Spanish drama films
1970s Spanish-language films
1970s Spanish films